The following list of Carnegie libraries in Kansas provides detailed information on United States Carnegie libraries in Kansas, where 59 public libraries were built from 58 grants (totaling $874,996) awarded by the Carnegie Corporation of New York from 1900 to 1916. In addition, academic libraries were built at 7 institutions (totaling $195,500).

Key

Public libraries

Academic libraries

Notes

References

Note: The above references, while all authoritative, are not entirely mutually consistent. Some details of this list may have been drawn from one of the references (usually Jones) without support from the others.  Reader discretion is advised.

External links
 Carnegie Legacy in Kansas by Allen Gardiner

 
Kansas
Libraries
Libraries